The Focke-Achgelis Fa 225 was an experimental single-seat rotary wing glider built in Nazi Germany by Focke-Achgelis in 1942. Only a single example was constructed.

Design and development
In the first half of the Second World War, the DFS 230B assault glider was used primarily to land troops and supplies, but was found of limited capability as it needed a  relatively large landing area. The Fa 225 was conceived to marry the rotor of the Focke-Achgelis Fa 223 with the fuselage of the DFS 230B, allowing the glider to land in 18 m or less. The rotor was mounted on a framework of struts above the centre of gravity and strengthened long stroke undercarriage units were fitted either side and at the tail.

Towed behind a Junkers Ju 52/3m, Carl Bode piloted the Fa 225 on its first flight in 1943. Construction of the aircraft only took seven weeks, but series production was not proceeded with due to the relatively slow aero-towing speed and changes in operational doctrine.

Specifications

See also
Focke-Achgelis Fa 223
Focke-Achgelis Fa 330
Focke-Achgelis Fa 269

References
Citations

Bibliography

External links

Fa 225
1940s German military transport aircraft
1940s German helicopters
Transverse rotor helicopters
Rotor kites
World War II helicopters of Germany
Aircraft first flown in 1942